Miss USA 2003 was the 52nd Miss USA pageant, held at the San Antonio Municipal Auditorium in San Antonio, Texas on March 24, 2003. It was the first time it had been held in this state since 1996 when the pageant was held in South Padre Island. It was the latest it had been held since 1986, as previous pageants had been held in February or early March and this was the first Miss USA to be broadcast on NBC, replacing CBS, which had broadcast the pageant since 1963.

The pageant was won by Susie Castillo of Massachusetts, who was crowned by outgoing queen Shauntay Hinton of the District of Columbia. The format reverted to a Top Ten who competed in swimsuit and evening gown, although, as with 2002, there was no interview competition for the semi-finalists.  This would be the last year where a top ten was called until 2017. The following Miss Universe Organization pageant, Miss Universe 2003 and onward, fifteen semi-finalists have been called each year.

Daisy Fuentes co-hosted the event for the first time (although she had been a color commentator in 1995), joined by Billy Bush who would also host the 2004 and 2005 events, as well as the Miss Universe pageants all three years. Color commentary was added by reigning Miss USA Shauntay Hinton.  Entertainment was provided by Burn The Floor.

Results

Placements

Special awards

Order of Announcements

Top 10

 

Top 5

Contestants
The Miss USA 2003 delegates were:

Historical significance
Massachusetts wins competition for the second time.
Alabama earns the 1st runner-up position for the third time. The last time it placed this was in 1992.
Texas earns the 2nd runner-up position for the second time. The last time it placed this was in 1978. Also this was reached the highest placement since Kandace Krueger won in 2001.
Michigan earns the 3rd runner-up position for the first time and reached its highest placement in 1996.
Tennessee earns the 4th runner-up position for the first time and reached its highest placement since Lynnette Cole won in 2000.
States that placed in semifinals the previous year were Alabama, Indiana, South Carolina and Texas.
Texas placed for the third consecutive year.
Alabama, Indiana and South Carolina placed for their second consecutive year.
Hawaii last placed in 1997 where Brook Lee won the title. Ironically, Lee went on to win the Miss Universe title in 1997.
Massachusetts last placed in 1998 where Shawnae Jebbia won the title. Coincidentally, Castillo was Miss Massachusetts Teen USA 1998 when Jebbia won the Miss USA title.
New Mexico last placed in 1999.
Michigan, Oklahoma, Tennessee last placed in 2001.
District of Columbia and Rhode Island break an ongoing streak of placements since 2001.

Contestant notes
This year had the largest numbers of crossover delegates, and equalled the record set for the highest number of former Miss Teen USA contestants. The record was not surpassed until Miss USA 2007 where 11 former Miss Teen USA delegates competed.
Delegates who had previously or would later compete at Miss America were:
Stacey Storey (Alaska) - Miss Alaska 1995
Erin Caperton MacGregor (Colorado) - Miss Colorado 1999
Ashley Huff (Nevada) - Miss Nevada 2001
Beth Hood (Tennessee) - Miss Tennessee 2000
Breann Parriott (Washington) Miss Washington 2001
Delegates who had previously competed at Miss Teen USA were:
Cheryl Crowe (Delaware) -  Miss Delaware USA 1997
Michelle Dollie Wright (District of Columbia) - Miss District of Columbia Teen USA 1995
Tashina Kastigar (Indiana) - Miss Indiana Teen USA 1998
Susie Castillo (Massachusetts) - Miss Massachusetts Teen USA 1998 (Teen with Style)
Sarah Cahill (model) (Minnesota) - Miss Minnesota Teen USA 1996
Allison Bloodworth (Mississippi) - Miss Mississippi Teen USA 1999
Alina Ogle (New Mexico) - Miss New Mexico Teen USA 1999
Kristen Luneberg (North Carolina) Miss Rhode Island Teen USA 1998
Nicole O'Brian (Texas) - Miss Texas Teen USA 2000 (1st runner-up at Miss Teen USA 2000)
Jennifer Ripley (Vermont) -  Miss Vermont Teen USA 1999
Four contestants later appeared on reality television shows.  Nicole O'Brian appeared on The Amazing Race 5,  Krisily Kennedy was a runner-up on The Bachelor, Brittney Rogers appeared with her family on The Amazing Race: Family Edition, and Candace Smith appeared on Survivor: Tocantins.

Judges
Kristian Alfonso
Brooke Burke
Vincent Longo
Gretchen Polhemus
Melania Knauss
Mekhi Phifer
Warren Sapp
John E. Blaha

See also
Miss Universe 2003
Miss Teen USA 2003

Notes and references

Notes

References

External links
Miss USA official website 

2003
2003 beauty pageants
March 2003 events in the United States
2003 in Texas